Adventures in Blackmoor is a 64-page Dungeons & Dragons fantasy role-playing game adventure, designed to be compatible with the Dungeons & Dragons Expert Set.

Plot summary

Adventures in Blackmoor is a scenario set in the land of Blackmoor, 3000 years before other D&D scenarios by TSR. The player characters are transported from their "modern" time to the time of Blackmoor and must rescue King Uther from The Prison Out of Time.

The adventure takes place in three parts inside an inn. The first part of the adventure takes place in a dungeon setting. Clues found in the inn lead to the second part of the adventure. The inn shifts between dimensions for the second part of the adventure, which concerns itself with certain changes taking place inside the inn as it shifts. In the third and final part of the adventure, the inn shifts to another dungeon.

The final 20 pages of the adventure give a description of Blackmoor, and detail 38 prominent NPCs from the setting. The module includes campaign setting material on Blackmoor and the Thonian Empire.

Publication history
DA1 Adventures in Blackmoor was written by Dave L. Arneson and David J. Ritchie, and published by TSR in 1986 as a 64-page booklet with a color map and outer folder. The module uses Arneson's original campaign setting of Blackmoor, updated for the D&D Expert Rules. It features cover art by Jeff Easley and interior artwork by Jim Holloway. It is designed for character levels 10–14, and features some locations and characters from Dave Arneson's original Blackmoor campaign.

This module consists of a 64-page booklet and an A2 color map inside a wraparound card cover. Also included are seven pages of background for the DM, which give the history of the area in which the adventure is set, as well as three more pages introducing the player characters to the world of Blackmoor.

Reception
Graeme Davis reviewed Adventures in Blackmoor for White Dwarf #86, calling the adventure "a device to get the Player characters into the world of Blackmoor from wherever they happen to be at the time". Davis felt that having the adventure take place in three versions of the same inn "cuts down on the map requirement but can lead to a static feel in play". He noted that while the adventure's introduction links it to X1 Isle of Dread, the device could be used in any game world. He felt that ending the adventure in an old-fashioned "zoo-dungeon" was disappointing, "reminding us of Blackmoor's origins", but that the clues leading to the second part of the adventure were intriguing.

Davis felt that the background provided on Blackmoor was interesting information, but was too little for Dungeon Masters to base further adventures on the setting. He found that the adventure only has one core idea that doesn't get explored much. He was also disappointed that Blackmoor wasn't explored much "despite the colour map which comes as part of the package".  Davis does note that players familiar with TSR and Judges' Guild products of the late 1970s would get a feeling of nostalgia from this adventure, and that the "zoo-dungeon" is "well written and set out, with a reasonable plot, and should provide an interesting and enjoyable session's play", despite how such adventures had become old fashioned by the time this module was published. He concluded the review by stating that the module "makes a reasonably good introduction to Blackmoor, but a lot will rest on DA2 and the rest of the series; as a campaign starter DA1 has a lot going for it, but it will stand or fall on what comes next".

See also
 List of Dungeons & Dragons modules

References

Dungeons & Dragons modules
Role-playing game supplements introduced in 1986